Waipu Cove is a locality and bay of Bream Bay in the Whangarei District and Northland Region of New Zealand. It is about 9 km southeast of Waipu and 5 km northwest of Langs Beach. It has a long sandy beach.

Demographics
They are  part of the larger Waipu statistical area.

Waipu Cove had a population of 135 at the 2018 New Zealand census, an increase of 18 people (15.4%) since the 2013 census, and an increase of 15 people (12.5%) since the 2006 census. There were 57 households, comprising 69 males and 63 females, giving a sex ratio of 1.1 males per female. The median age was 54.0 years (compared with 37.4 years nationally), with 21 people (15.6%) aged under 15 years, 12 (8.9%) aged 15 to 29, 69 (51.1%) aged 30 to 64, and 33 (24.4%) aged 65 or older.

Ethnicities were 93.3% European/Pākehā, 13.3% Māori, 2.2% Pacific peoples, and 6.7% Asian. People may identify with more than one ethnicity.

Although some people chose not to answer the census's question about religious affiliation, 46.7% had no religion and 46.7% were Christian.

Of those at least 15 years old, 24 (21.1%) people had a bachelor's or higher degree, and 15 (13.2%) people had no formal qualifications. The median income was $39,400, compared with $31,800 nationally. 18 people (15.8%) earned over $70,000 compared to 17.2% nationally. The employment status of those at least 15 was that 51 (44.7%) people were employed full-time, 21 (18.4%) were part-time, and 3 (2.6%) were unemployed.

Education
The first Waipu Cove School was established in 1863 and closed in 1867. Another school opened in a temporary building in 1870, and gained a permanent building in 1877. It closed in 1939.

References 

Whangarei District
Populated places in the Northland Region